Sellicks Hill – formerly spelt Sellick's Hill – is a semi-rural suburb of Adelaide, South Australia. It lies within both the City of Onkaparinga and the District Council of Yankalilla. Before the British colonisation of South Australia, the Sellicks Hill area (along with most of the Adelaide plains area and down the western side of the Fleurieu Peninsula), was inhabited by the Kaurna people. Sellick's Hill Post Office opened on 2 July 1860.

References

Suburbs of Adelaide